Simone Addessi (born 1 January 1995) is an Italian professional footballer who plays as a winger for Serie D club Lamezia Terme.

Club career
On 21 December 2021, he signed with Serie D club Casertana as a free agent.

References

External links

1995 births
Living people
People from Latina, Lazio
Footballers from Lazio
Italian footballers
Association football midfielders
Serie C players
Serie D players
Latina Calcio 1932 players
Parma Calcio 1913 players
Rimini F.C. 1912 players
S.S. Racing Club Fondi players
Cavese 1919 players
A.C.R. Messina players
Casertana F.C. players
Sportspeople from the Province of Latina